FC Malacky is a Slovak association football club located in Malacky. It currently plays in 3. Liga (Bratislava) (3rd level).

Current squad

External links
Official website 
Futbalnet profile

References

Football clubs in Slovakia
Association football clubs established in 2013